Afrida mesomelaena is a moth of the family Nolidae. It is found in Jamaica.

References

Nolidae
Moths of the Caribbean
Endemic fauna of Jamaica
Lepidoptera of Jamaica
Moths described in 1914